Lakerda is a pickled bonito dish eaten as a mezze in the Balkans and Middle East.  Lakerda made from one-year-old bonito migrating through the Bosphorus is especially prized.

Name
Lakerda (λακέρδα) comes from Byzantine Greek lakerta (λακέρτα) 'mackerel', which in turn comes from Latin lacerta 'mackerel' or 'horse mackerel'. The Turkish word lakerda, attested before 1566, is a loan from the Greek.

Preparation
Steaks of bonito are boned, soaked in brine, then salted and weighted for about a week. They are then ready to eat, or may be stored in olive oil.
Sometimes large mackerel or small tuna are used instead of bonito.

Serving
In Greece, lakerda is usually served as a mezze, with sliced onion. Lemon juice and olive oil are common but criticized accompaniments. In Turkey it is usually served as mezze, with sliced red onion, olive oil and black pepper. It is generally accompanied with rakı.

History
Lakerda is very similar to a prized ancient Greek dish, tarikhos horaion 'ripe salted fish' or simply horaion. Other ancient salt bonito preparations were called omotarikhos and kybion.

See also 
 Ceviche
 Boquerones en vinagre

Notes

Greek cuisine
Byzantine cuisine
Greek words and phrases
Ottoman cuisine
Uncooked fish dishes
Fermented fish
Bulgarian cuisine